Home Rule Party may refer to:
Home Rule Party (Burma)
Home Rule Party (Faroe Islands)
Home Rule Party of Hawaii
Home Rule Party (Iceland)
Home Rule League (Ireland)
British Empire Citizens' and Workers' Home Rule Party (Trinidad and Tobago)